The 2019–20 network television schedule for the five major English-language commercial broadcast networks in the United States covers the prime time hours from September 2019 to August 2020. The schedule is followed by a list per network of returning series, new series, and series canceled after the 2018–19 season.

NBC was the first to announce its fall schedule on May 12, 2019, followed by Fox on May 13, ABC on May 14, CBS on May 15, and The CW on May 16, 2019.

PBS is not included, as member television stations have local flexibility over most of their schedules and broadcast times for network shows may vary. Ion Television and MyNetworkTV are also not included since both networks' schedules comprise syndicated reruns. The CW does not air network programming on Saturday nights.

New series are highlighted in bold.

All times are U.S. Eastern and Pacific Time (except for some live sports or events). Subtract one hour for Central, Mountain, Alaska, and Hawaii-Aleutian times.

Each of the 30 highest-rated shows is listed with its rank and rating as determined by Nielsen Media Research.

The TV season was strongly affected by the COVID-19 pandemic. While the full impact of the health catastrophe did not hit until March 2020, by which time the network shows had already filmed the majority of their seasons' scripts, the entire primetime slate halted production that spring and did not resume it until the fall of 2020.

Legend

The outbreak of the COVID-19 pandemic in March 2020 caused television production to shut down across the United States, which resulted in multiple shows concluding with slightly shorter seasons than originally planned.

Sunday

Monday

Tuesday

Wednesday

Thursday

Friday

Saturday

Note: As with the two previous seasons, NBC aired all new live episodes of Saturday Night Live in real time with the rest of the United States, placing it in that time period for the Pacific and Mountain time viewers beginning September 28, with a rebroadcast following the late local news in those time zones. The network's affiliates in Alaska, Hawaii, and other Pacific Islands will continued to air the show on a delay. Due to the COVID-19 pandemic, three "At Home" editions of the series have aired, but have been pre-compiled and edited before broadcast, airing after the late local news in all time zones.
Note: Due to the suspension of the 2019–20 NBA season, NBA Saturday Primetime games were replaced by encores of ABC programming, as well as docuseries The Last Dance. The 76ers-Warriors game on March 7 wound up being the "season finale" for NBA Saturday Primetime, as the Warriors were not invited to Orlando when the NBA resumed play in July.
Note: Fox aired primetime PBC Fight Cards throughout its Late summer programming schedule.

By network

ABC

Returning series:
20/20
Agents of S.H.I.E.L.D.
America's Funniest Home Videos
American Housewife
American Idol
The Bachelor
Black-ish
Bless This Mess
Celebrity Family Feud
The Conners
Dancing with the Stars
Fresh Off the Boat
The Goldbergs
The Good Doctor
The Great American Baking Show
The Great Christmas Light Fight
Grey's Anatomy
Holey Moley
How to Get Away with Murder
Kids Say the Darndest Things (moved from CBS)
Match Game
A Million Little Things
Modern Family
NBA Saturday Primetime
Press Your Luck
The Rookie
Saturday Night Football
Schooled
Shark Tank
Single Parents
Station 19
To Tell the Truth
The Wonderful World of Disney
What Would You Do?
Who Wants to Be a Millionaire

New series:
The Bachelor Presents: Listen to Your Heart
The Bachelor: The Greatest Seasons - Ever!
The Baker and the Beauty
Don't
Emergence
For Life
The Genetic Detective
The Last Dance 
Mixed-ish
Stumptown
United We Fall

Not returning from 2018–19:
1969 
The $100,000 Pyramid (returned for 2020–21)
The Alec Baldwin Show
Bachelor in Paradise (returned for 2020–21)
The Bachelorette (returned for 2020–21)
Card Sharks (returned for 2020–21) 
Child Support
Dancing with the Stars: Juniors
Family Food Fight
The Fix
For the People
Grand Hotel
The Kids Are Alright
Reef Break
Speechless
Splitting Up Together
Videos After Dark
Whiskey Cavalier

CBS

Returning series:
48 Hours
60 Minutes
Big Brother
Blue Bloods
Bull
CBS Sunday Night Movies
Criminal Minds
FBI
God Friended Me
Hawaii Five-0
Love Island
MacGyver
Madam Secretary
Magnum P.I.
Man with a Plan
Mom
NCIS
NCIS: Los Angeles
NCIS: New Orleans
The Neighborhood
SEAL Team
Survivor
S.W.A.T.
Undercover Boss
Young Sheldon

New series:
All Rise
Bob Hearts Abishola
Broke
Carol's Second Act
Evil
FBI: Most Wanted
Game On!
The Greatest #AtHome Videos
Tommy
Tough as Nails
The Unicorn

Not returning from 2018–19:
The Amazing Race (returned for 2020–21)
The Big Bang Theory
Blood & Treasure (moved to Paramount+)
Celebrity Big Brother (returned for 2021–22) 
The Code
Elementary
Fam
The Good Fight
Happy Together
Instinct
Life in Pieces
Million Dollar Mile
Murphy Brown
Ransom
The Red Line
Whistleblower
The World's Best

The CW

Returning series:
The 100
All American
Arrow
Black Lightning
Bulletproof
Burden of Truth
Charmed
Dynasty
The Flash
In the Dark
Legacies
Legends of Tomorrow
Masters of Illusion
Mysteries Decoded
Penn & Teller: Fool Us
Riverdale
Roswell, New Mexico
Supergirl
Supernatural
Whose Line Is It Anyway?

New series:
Batwoman
Being Reuben
The Christmas Caroler Challenge
Coroner
The CW Happy Hour
Dead Pixels
Fridge Wars
Katy Keene
Killer Camp
Nancy Drew
Stargirl (shared with DC Universe)
Taskmaster
Tell Me a Story

Not returning from 2018–19:
The Big Stage
Crazy Ex-Girlfriend
Hypnotize Me
I Ship It
iZombie
Jane the Virgin
My Last Days
The Outpost (returned for 2020–21)
Pandora (returned for 2020–21)
Red Bull Peaking 
Two Sentence Horror Stories (returned for 2020–21)

Fox

Returning series:
9-1-1
Bob's Burgers
Empire
Family Guy
Fox College Football
Fox Major League Baseball
Fox PBC Fight Night
Fox Presents
Gordon Ramsay's 24 Hours to Hell and Back
Last Man Standing
The Masked Singer
NFL on Fox
The Resident
The Simpsons
Thursday Night Football
WWE SmackDown (moved from USA Network)

New series:
9-1-1: Lone Star
Almost Family
Bless the Harts
Celebrity Watch Party
Deputy
Duncanville
Flirty Dancing
Labor of Love
Lego Masters
The Masked Singer: After the Mask
The Moodys
Outmatched
Prodigal Son
Ultimate Tag

Not returning from 2018–19:
Beat Shazam (returned for 2020–21)
BH90210
The Cool Kids
First Responders Live
The Gifted
Gotham
Hell's Kitchen (returned for 2020–21)
Lethal Weapon
MasterChef (returned for 2020–21)
MasterChef Junior (returning for 2021–22)
Mental Samurai (returned for 2020–21)
The Orville (moved to Hulu)
Paradise Hotel
The Passage
Proven Innocent
Rel
So You Think You Can Dance (returning for 2021–22)
Spin the Wheel
Star
What Just Happened??! with Fred Savage

NBC

Returning series:
America's Got Talent
America's Got Talent: The Champions
The Blacklist
Blindspot
Brooklyn Nine-Nine
Chicago Fire
Chicago Med
Chicago P.D.
Dateline NBC
Ellen's Game of Games
Football Night in America
Good Girls
The Good Place
Hollywood Game Night
Law & Order: Special Victims Unit
Little Big Shots
Making It
Manifest
NBC Movie Night
NBC Sunday Night Football
New Amsterdam
NHL on NBC
Songland
Superstore
This Is Us
The Titan Games
The Voice
The Wall
Will & Grace
World of Dance

New series:
Bluff City Law
Council of Dads
Ellen's Greatest Night of Giveaways
Indebted
Lincoln Rhyme: Hunt for the Bone Collector
Perfect Harmony
Sunnyside
Zoey's Extraordinary Playlist

Not returning from 2018–19:
Abby's
American Ninja Warrior (returned for 2020–21)
A.P. Bio (moved to Peacock)
Bring the Funny
The Enemy Within
I Feel Bad
The InBetween
Midnight, Texas
The Village

Renewals and cancellations
Note: Series that were unable to fulfil their original or extended episode orders due to the COVID-19 pandemic have been indicated below.

Full season pickups

ABC
American Housewife—Picked up for six additional episodes on November 7, 2019, bringing the episode count to 21; one episode remained unfilmed.
Bless This Mess—Picked up for six additional episodes on November 7, 2019, bringing the episode count to 19.
The Conners—Picked up for six additional episodes on May 14, 2019, bringing the episode count to 19.
A Million Little Things—Picked up for a 19-episode full season on August 8, 2019.<ref>{{cite web|title=A Million Little Things''' XL-ish Season 2 Episode Count (Finally) Revealed|url=https://tvline.com/2019/08/08/a-million-little-things-season-2-episode-count-abc/|work=TVLine|date=August 8, 2019}}</ref>Mixed-ish—Picked up for a 22-episode full season on October 28, 2019.The Rookie—Picked up for a 20-episode full season on October 28, 2019.Schooled—Picked up for a 22-episode full season on December 3, 2019; one episode remained unfilmed.Stumptown—Picked up for five additional episodes on October 28, 2019, bringing the episode count to 18.

CBSAll Rise—Picked up for a 22-episode full season on October 22, 2019; two episodes were unfilmed, with one original episode compiled through web conferencing platforms.Bob Hearts Abishola—Picked up for a 22-episode full season on October 22, 2019; two episodes remained unfilmed.Carol's Second Act—Picked up for five additional episodes on October 22, 2019, bringing the episode count to 18.The Greatest #AtHome Videos—Picked up for four additional episodes on July 2, 2020, bringing this season's episode count to 5.MacGyver—Picked up for a 22-episode full season on November 6, 2019.The Unicorn—Picked up for five additional episodes on October 22, 2019, bringing the episode count to 18.

The CWThe 100—Picked up for three additional episodes on June 6, 2019, bringing the episode count to 16.All American—Picked up for three additional episodes on October 8, 2019, bringing the episode count to 16.Batwoman—Picked up for a 22-episode full season on October 25, 2019; two episodes remained unfilmed.Legacies—Picked up for four additional episodes on July 18, 2019, bringing the episode count to 20; four episodes remained unfilmed.Nancy Drew—Picked up a 22-episode full season on October 25, 2019; four episodes remained unfilmed.

FoxProdigal Son—Picked up for a 22-episode full season on October 7, 2019; two episodes remained unfilmed.

NBCGood Girls—Picked up for three additional episodes on August 14, 2019, bringing the episode count to 16; five episodes remained unfilmed.Superstore—Picked up for four additional episodes on November 5, 2019, bringing the episode count to 22; one episode remained unfilmed.

Renewals
ABC20/20—Renewed for a forty-third season on May 21, 2020.America's Funniest Home Videos—Renewed for a thirty-first season on October 29, 2018.American Housewife—Renewed for a fifth season on May 21, 2020.American Idol—Renewed for a nineteenth season on May 15, 2020.The Bachelor—Renewed for a twenty-fifth season on May 21, 2020.Black-ish—Renewed for a seventh season on May 21, 2020.Celebrity Family Feud—Renewed for an eighth season on March 28, 2021.The Conners—Renewed for a third season on May 21, 2020.Dancing with the Stars—Renewed for a twenty-ninth season on May 21, 2020.For Life—Renewed for a second season on June 15, 2020.The Goldbergs—Renewed for an eighth season on May 21, 2020.The Good Doctor—Renewed for a fourth season on February 10, 2020.The Great Christmas Light Fight—Renewed for an eighth season on November 1, 2019.Grey's Anatomy—Renewed for a seventeenth season on May 10, 2019.Holey Moley—Renewed for a third and fourth season on February 22, 2021.A Million Little Things—Renewed for a third season on May 21, 2020.Mixed-ish—Renewed for a second season on May 21, 2020.Press Your Luck—Renewed for a third season on April 7, 2021.  The Rookie—Renewed for a third season on May 21, 2020.Shark Tank—Renewed for a twelfth season on May 21, 2020.Station 19—Renewed for a fourth season on March 11, 2020.To Tell the Truth—Renewed for a sixth season on November 10, 2020.Who Wants to Be a Millionaire—Renewed for a twenty-second season on May 21, 2020.

CBS48 Hours—Renewed for a thirty-third season on May 6, 2020.60 Minutes—Renewed for a fifty-third season on May 6, 2020.All Rise—Renewed for a second season on May 6, 2020.Big Brother—Renewed for a twenty-third season on October 28, 2020.Blue Bloods—Renewed for an eleventh season on May 6, 2020.Bob Hearts Abishola—Renewed for a second season on May 6, 2020.Bull—Renewed for a fifth season on May 6, 2020.Evil—Renewed for a second season on October 22, 2019. It was announced on May 18, 2021, that the series would be moving to Paramount+.FBI—Renewed for a third season on May 6, 2020.FBI: Most Wanted—Renewed for a second season on May 6, 2020.The Greatest #AtHome Videos—Renewed for a second season on June 14, 2021.Love Island—Renewed for a third season on January 27, 2021.MacGyver—Renewed for a fifth and final season on May 6, 2020.Magnum P.I.—Renewed for a third season on May 6, 2020.Mom—Renewed for an eighth and final season on February 5, 2019.NCIS—Renewed for an eighteenth season on May 6, 2020.NCIS: Los Angeles—Renewed for a twelfth season on May 6, 2020.NCIS: New Orleans—Renewed for a seventh and final season on May 6, 2020.The Neighborhood—Renewed for a third season on May 6, 2020.SEAL Team—Renewed for a fourth season on May 6, 2020.Survivor—Renewed for a forty-first season on May 6, 2020.S.W.A.T.—Renewed for a fourth season on May 6, 2020.Tough as Nails—Renewed for a second season on August 12, 2020.Undercover Boss—Renewed for a tenth season on May 6, 2020.The Unicorn—Renewed for a second season on May 6, 2020.Young Sheldon—Renewed for a fourth season on February 22, 2019.

The CWAll American—Renewed for a third season on January 7, 2020.Batwoman—Renewed for a second season on January 7, 2020.Black Lightning—Renewed for a fourth and final season on January 7, 2020.Bulletproof—Renewed for a third season on October 27, 2020.Burden of Truth—Renewed for a fourth and final season on October 27, 2020. Charmed—Renewed for a third season on January 7, 2020.The Christmas Caroler Challenge—Renewed for a second season on October 19, 2020.Coroner—Renewed for a second season on August 17, 2020.DC's Stargirl—Renewed for a second season on July 6, 2020.Dead Pixels—Renewed for a second season on April 29, 2021.Dynasty—Renewed for a fourth season on January 7, 2020.The Flash—Renewed for a seventh season on January 7, 2020.In the Dark—Renewed for a third season on January 7, 2020.Killer Camp—Renewed for a second season on March 8, 2021.Legacies—Renewed for a third season on January 7, 2020.Legends of Tomorrow—Renewed for a sixth season on January 7, 2020.Masters of Illusion—Renewed for an eleventh season on April 29, 2021.Mysteries Decoded—Renewed for a second season on April 7, 2022.Nancy Drew—Renewed for a second season on January 7, 2020.Penn & Teller: Fool Us—Renewed for an eighth season on May 14, 2020.Riverdale—Renewed for a fifth season on January 7, 2020.Roswell, New Mexico—Renewed for a third season on January 7, 2020.Supergirl—Renewed for a sixth and final season on January 7, 2020.Supernatural—The series was scheduled to end in May 2020, but seven episodes remained unaired in its fifteenth season due to the coronavirus pandemic shutting down filming and post-production in Vancouver, ergo pushing the series finale to Fall 2020.Tell Me a Story—Returned for the second season in Fall 2020.Whose Line Is It Anyway?—Renewed for a seventeenth season on May 14, 2020.

Fox9-1-1—Renewed for a fourth season on April 13, 2020.9-1-1: Lone Star—Renewed for a second season on April 13, 2020.Bless the Harts—Renewed for a second season on October 18, 2019.Bob's Burgers—Renewed for an eleventh season on May 11, 2020.Duncanville—Renewed for a second season on April 6, 2020.Family Guy—Renewed for a nineteenth season on May 11, 2020.Last Man Standing—Renewed for a ninth and final season on May 19, 2020.Lego Masters—Renewed for a second season on November 11, 2020.The Masked Singer—Renewed for a fourth season on May 6, 2020. The Moodys—Renewed for a second season on July 10, 2020.Prodigal Son—Renewed for a second season on May 21, 2020.The Resident—Renewed for a fourth season on May 19, 2020.The Simpsons—Renewed for a thirty-second season on February 6, 2019.Thursday Night Football—Renewed for a seventh season on January 31, 2018; deal will go to a ninth season in 2022.

NBCAmerica's Got Talent—Renewed for a sixteenth season on November 9, 2020.The Blacklist—Renewed for an eighth season on February 20, 2020. Brooklyn Nine-Nine—Renewed for an eighth and final season on November 14, 2019.Chicago Fire—Renewed for a ninth, tenth and eleventh season on February 27, 2020.Chicago Med—Renewed for a sixth, seventh and eighth season on February 27, 2020.Chicago P.D.—Renewed for an eighth, ninth and tenth season on February 27, 2020.Ellen's Game of Games—Renewed for a fourth season on February 18, 2020.Football Night in America—Renewed for a fifteenth season on December 14, 2011; deal will go to a seventeenth season in 2022.Good Girls—Renewed for a fourth season on May 15, 2020.Law & Order: Special Victims Unit—Renewed for a twenty-second, twenty-third and twenty-fourth season on February 27, 2020.Making It—Renewed for a third  season on January 11, 2020.Manifest—Renewed for a third season on June 15, 2020.NBC Sunday Night Football—Renewed for a fifteenth season on December 14, 2011; deal will go to a seventeenth season in 2022.New Amsterdam—Renewed for a third, fourth, and fifth season on January 11, 2020.Superstore—Renewed for a sixth and final season on February 11, 2020.This Is Us—Renewed for a fifth and sixth season on May 12, 2019.The Voice—Renewed for a nineteenth season on June 16, 2020.The Wall—Renewed for a fourth season on September 30, 2020.Zoey's Extraordinary Playlist—Renewed for a second season on June 11, 2020.

Cancellations/series endings
ABCAgents of S.H.I.E.L.D.—It was announced on July 18, 2019, that season seven would be the final season. The series concluded on August 12, 2020.The Bachelor: The Greatest Seasons – Ever!–The retrospective miniseries was meant to run for one season only; it concluded on September 7, 2020.The Baker and the Beauty—Canceled on June 15, 2020.Bless This Mess—Canceled on May 21, 2020, after two seasons.Don't—Canceled on April 7, 2021.Emergence—Canceled on May 21, 2020.Fresh Off the Boat—It was announced on November 8, 2019, that season six would be the final season. The series concluded on February 21, 2020.How to Get Away with Murder—It was announced on July 11, 2019, that season six would be the final season. The series concluded on May 14, 2020.Kids Say the Darndest Things—Canceled on May 21, 2020. On December 17, 2020, it was announced that CBS would pick up the series for another season.The Last Dance—The documentary miniseries was meant to run for one season only; it concluded on June 20, 2020.Modern Family—It was announced on February 5, 2019, that season eleven would be the final season. The series concluded on April 8, 2020.Schooled—Canceled on May 21, 2020, after two seasons.Single Parents—Canceled on May 21, 2020, after two seasons.Stumptown—Canceled on September 16, 2020, due to COVID-related production delays, following the reversal of its May 2020 renewal.United We Fall—Canceled on September 15, 2020.

CBSBroke—Canceled on May 6, 2020. The series concluded on June 25, 2020.Carol's Second Act—Canceled on May 6, 2020.Criminal Minds—It was announced on January 10, 2019, that season fifteen would be the final season. The series concluded on February 19, 2020.God Friended Me—Canceled on April 14, 2020, after two seasons. The series concluded on April 26, 2020.Hawaii Five-0—It was announced on February 28, 2020, that season ten would be the final season. The series concluded on April 3, 2020.Madam Secretary—It was announced on May 15, 2019, that season six would be the final season. The series concluded on December 8, 2019.Man with a Plan—Canceled on May 6, 2020, after four seasons. The series concluded on June 11, 2020.Tommy—Canceled on May 6, 2020. The series concluded the following day.

The CWThe 100—It was announced on August 4, 2019, that season seven would be the final season. The series concluded on September 30, 2020.Arrow—It was announced on March 6, 2019, that season eight would be the final season. The series concluded on January 28, 2020.Being Reuben—The documentary miniseries was meant to run for one season only; it concluded on September 11, 2020. Katy Keene—Canceled on July 2, 2020. This was the only cancellation of the season.Taskmaster—On August 5, 2020, The CW pulled the series from its prime-time schedule. The remaining episodes were made available on CW Seed on August 10, 2020.

FoxAlmost Family—Canceled on March 2, 2020. Deputy—Canceled on April 3, 2020. Empire—It was announced on May 13, 2019, that season six would be the final season. The series concluded on April 21, 2020.Flirty Dancing—Canceled on May 18, 2020.Labor of Love—Canceled on September 8, 2021.Outmatched—Canceled on May 19, 2020.

NBCBlindspot—It was announced on May 10, 2019, that season five would be the final season. The series concluded on July 23, 2020.Bluff City Law—Canceled on June 15, 2020.Council of Dads—Canceled on June 25, 2020. The series concluded on July 2, 2020.The Good Place—It was announced on June 7, 2019, that season four would be the final season. The series concluded on January 30, 2020.Indebted—Canceled on June 15, 2020.Lincoln Rhyme: Hunt for the Bone Collector—Canceled on June 10, 2020.Perfect Harmony—Canceled on June 10, 2020.Sunnyside—Canceled on October 15, 2019, marking the first cancellation of the season. The remaining unaired episodes aired on NBC's website. The series concluded on December 5, 2019.Will & Grace—It was announced on July 25, 2019, that season eleven would be the final season. The series concluded on April 23, 2020.World of Dance''—Canceled on March 15, 2021, after four seasons.

See also
2019–20 Canadian network television schedule
2019–20 United States network television schedule (daytime)
2019–20 United States network television schedule (late night)
Impact of the COVID-19 pandemic on television in the United States

Notes

References

United States primetime network television schedules
2019 in American television
2020 in American television